Deepak Sharma (born 11 February 1960) is an Indian former cricketer. He played first-class cricket for Delhi and Haryana between 1981 and 1993.

See also
 List of Delhi cricketers

References

External links
 

1960 births
Living people
Indian cricketers
Delhi cricketers
Haryana cricketers
Cricketers from Delhi